Michael Hicks may refer to:

 Michael Hicks (game designer) (born 1993), independent video game designer and musician
 Sir Michael Hicks (1543–1612), English courtier, secretary to Lord Burghley
 Michael Hicks (British Army officer) (1928–2008), British general
 Michael Hicks (basketball, born 1976), Panamanian basketball player
 Michael Hicks (basketball, born 1983), American-Polish basketball player
 Michael J. Hicks (born 1962), economist and columnist
 Mike Hicks (trade unionist) (1937–2017), British communist and trade unionist
 Michael Hicks (historian) (born 1948), British historian
 165659 Michaelhicks, a main-belt minor planet
 Michael Hicks (musicologist) (born 1956), BYU professor of music and composer
 Michael Hicks (American football) (born 1973), American football player